The Big Three (Turkish: "Üç Büyükler") is the colloquial name given to Beşiktaş J.K., Fenerbahçe S.K. and Galatasaray S.K., the three most successful sports clubs in Turkey. They all are based in Istanbul.

The three-way rivalry
      As of 8 Sep 2022

Fenerbahçe vs. Galatasaray

Fenerbahçe vs. Beşiktaş

Beşiktaş vs. Galatasaray

Trophies 
:

UEFA 5-year Club Ranking of the Big Three (Türkiye) 
Last update: 28 Aug 2022

Big Three (Türkiye) in European competitions 
Last update: 8 Sep 2022

Head-to-head ranking in Süper Lig

• Total: Fenerbahçe with 25 higher finishes, Galatasaray with 24 higher finishes, Beşiktaş with 15 higher finishes (as of the end of the 2021–22 season).

Players who have played for the three clubs

: 
  Refik Osman Top (Beşiktaş 1912–1913, 1923–1924, Fenerbahçe 1913–1915 and 1923, Galatasaray 1915–1917, 1921–1922, 1923 and 1924)
  Ali Soydan (Galatasaray 1951–1957, Fenerbahçe 1959–1960, Beşiktaş 1963–1964)
  Saffet Sancaklı (Beşiktaş 1987–1991, Galatasaray 1994–1995, Fenerbahçe 1996–1998)
  Sergen Yalçın (Beşiktaş 1991–1997 and 2002-2006,  Fenerbahçe 1999–2000, Galatasaray 2000 and 2001–02)
  Ahmet Yıldırım (Fenerbahçe 1993–1994, Galatasaray 1999–2001, Beşiktaş 2001–2005)
  Emre Aşık (Fenerbahçe 1993–1996, Galatasaray 2000–2003 and 2006–2010, Beşiktaş 2003–2006)
  Mehmet Yozgatlı (Galatasaray 1999–2000, Fenerbahçe 2004–2007, Beşiktaş 2007–2008)
  Burak Yılmaz (Beşiktaş 2006–2008 and 2019–2020,  Fenerbahçe 2008–2010, Galatasaray 2012–2016)
  Caner Erkin (Galatasaray 2009–2010,  Fenerbahçe 2010–2016 and 2020–2021, Beşiktaş 2016–2020)
  Mehmet Topal (Galatasaray 2006–2010, Fenerbahçe 2012–2019, Beşiktaş 2021–2022)

Managers who have managed the three clubs

:
  Mustafa Denizli (Galatasaray 1987–1989, 1990–1992, 2015–2016, Fenerbahçe 2000–2002, Beşiktaş 2008–2010)

See also
 Big Three (Belgium)
 Big Three (Costa Rica)
 Big Three (Greece)
 Big Three (Netherlands)
 Big Three (Peru)
 Big Three (Portugal)

References 

Football in Turkey
Turkey football rivalries
Big Three (Turkey)
Big Three (Turkey)
Big Three (Turkey)
Trios